John William Fedchock (born September 18, 1957) is an American jazz trombonist, bandleader, and arranger.

Early life and education 
Fedchock was born in Cleveland, Ohio. He studied at Ohio State University and the Eastman School of Music at the University of Rochester.

Career 
Fedchock worked for the Woody Herman Orchestra in the 1980s and was noted for his arrangements. He also worked with Gerry Mulligan, Louie Bellson, Bob Belden, Rosemary Clooney, and Susannah McCorkle. He recorded his first album as a leader in 1992 with the New York Big Band, which was active into the late-2000s.

Discography
 New York Big Band (Reservoir, 1992)
 On the Edge (Reservoir, 1998)
 Hit the Bricks (Reservoir, 2000)
 No Nonsense (Reservoir, 2002)
 Up and Running (Reservoir, 2007)
 Fluidity (Summit, 2015)
 Like It Is (MAMA, 2015)
 Reminiscence (Summit, 2018)

References

20th-century American musicians
21st-century American musicians
American jazz bandleaders
American jazz trombonists
Male trombonists
Eastman School of Music alumni
Living people
Ohio State University alumni
1957 births
Jazz musicians from Ohio
Musicians from Cleveland
21st-century trombonists
20th-century American male musicians
21st-century American male musicians
American male jazz musicians
Reservoir Records artists